The Christian Upliftment School, which is located in Kampala, Uganda, mainly serves orphans who have been displaced by Lord's Resistance Army insurgency in the north. These students have been brought to Kampala where it is much safer. The school was founded in 2005.

External links
 Christian Upliftment Nursery & Primary School
 The Christian Upliftment School

Nondenominational Christian schools
Lord's Resistance Army
Schools in Uganda 
Christian schools in Uganda
Educational institutions established in 2005
Schools in Kampala
Organizations for children affected by war
Organizations for orphaned and abandoned children
2005 establishments in Uganda